The 1925 Birmingham–Southern Panthers football team was an American football team that represented Birmingham–Southern College as a member of the Southern Intercollegiate Athletic Association during the 1925 college football season. In their second season under head coach Harold Drew, the team compiled a 7–3–1 record.

Schedule

References

Birmingham-Southern
Birmingham–Southern Panthers football seasons
Birmingham-Southern Panthers football